Malavi may refer to:

 Malavi, India
 Malavi, Iran
 Malavi Rural District
 Malvi breed of cattle

See also
 Malawi, a landlocked country in southeastern Africa
 Mali, a landlocked country in West Africa
 Mallavi, a town in Mullaitivu District, Sri Lanka
 Mallawi, a city in Egypt
 Marawi, a city in Lanao del Sur, Philippines